The German women's national ice hockey team represents Germany at the International Ice Hockey Federation (IIHF) Women's World Championship and other international ice hockey tournaments. The women's national team was ranked eighth in the IIHF World Ranking in 2020. It is organized under the direct administration of the Deutscher Eishockey-Bund (DEB).

Women's participation in ice hockey in Germany has slowly declined in the past decade – in 2011 the country had 2,549 female players registered with the IIHF but reported only 2,251 in 2020.

History
The first international game for the German women's national team took place on 3 December 1988 in Geretsried against Switzerland. The final score was 6–5 for the Swiss, but the Germans avenged the loss in their second match. Against the Swiss, the Germans obtained their first victory. 

In preparation for the 2013 IIHF Women's World Championship, the Carleton Ice House, home of the Carleton Ravens women's ice hockey program, served as the training facility for the German team. Former Ravens team captain Sara Seiler served as a member of the German squad. Of note, the Ravens hosted Germany in an exhibition game, which saw the Germans prevail by a 3–0 tally, with goals from Julia Zorn, Franziska Busch, and Andrea Lanzl.

Germany's best finish at the Worlds was in 2017, where they finished fourth after an upset victory over Russia in the quarterfinals.

Tournament record

Olympic
2002 – Finished in 6th place
2006 – Finished in 5th place
2014 – Finished in 6th place

World Championship
1990 – Finished in 7th place (as West Germany)
1994 – Finished in 8th place
1999 – Finished in 7th place
2000 – Finished in 7th place
2001 – Finished in 5th place
2004 – Finished in 6th place
2005 – Finished in 5th place
2007 – Finished in 8th place
2008 – Finished in 9th place (relegated to Division I)
2009 – Finished in 11th place (2nd in Division I)
2011 – Finished in 9th place (1st in Division I, promoted to Top Division)
2012 – Finished in 7th place
2013 – Finished in 5th place
2015 – Finished in 8th place (relegated to Division IA)
2016 – Finished in 9th place (1st in Division IA, promoted to Top Division)
2017 – Finished in 4th place
2019 – Finished in 7th place
2020 – Cancelled due to the coronavirus pandemic
2021 – Finished in 8th place
2022 – Finished in 9th place

European Championship
1989 – Won bronze medal (as West Germany)
1991 – Finished in 6th place
1993 – Finished in 4th place
1995 – Finished in 5th place
1996 – Finished in 6th place

Team

Current roster
Roster for the 2022 IIHF Women's World Championship.

Head Coach: Thomas Schädler

Notable former players
Claudia Grundmann
Michaela Lanzl
Christina Oswald
Denise Soesilo
Raffaela Wolf

Former coaches
 1988–1989: Pia Sterner
 1989–1990: Pierre Delisle
 1990–1994: Hanspeter Amend
 1994–1995: Alfred Neidhart
 1995–2002: Rainer Nittel
 2002–2014: Peter Kathan
 2014–2018: Benjamin Hinterstocker
 2018–2019: Christian Künast
 2020–2021: Franziska Busch
 2021–present: Thomas Schädler

References

External links

IIHF profile

Nat
Women's national ice hockey teams in Europe
Ice hockey